Shiv Kumar Shastri शिवकुमार शास्त्री(1915-1989) was an Indian politician, social reformer and Vedic Scholar. He was born on 15 October 1915 at Village Arya Nagar, District Aligarh(U.P.).He was Sisodia Rajput. His father was Shri Ram Chandra Singh & mother was Smt. Gayatri Devi. His wife's name was Smt. Somlata Devi. He was a member of the Fourth and Fifth Aligarh (Lok Sabha constituency). 
He won the 1967 (Fourth) Lok Sabha Elections as an independent candidate. 
In 1971, he joined Bhartiya Kranti Dal party(lead by Shri Chaudhary Charan Singh) and fought the 1971(Fifth) Lok Sabha Elections. He was the only elected candidate out of 101 candidates of the party in that election.

Education
He studied at Gurukul Suryakund, Badaun (Vidya Bhushan), Sanskrit University, Varanasi (Shastri), and Sanskrit Association, Calcutta (Kavya and Viyakaran Tirth).

Designation
He was President of Arya Pratinidhi Sabha, Uttar Pradesh;Chancellor of  Gurukul Brindaban (Mathura); 
He was Member of (i) Agra University Executive Committee, (ii) Sarvadeshik Arya Pratinidhi Sabha, Delhi (iii) Fourth Lok Sabha, 1967–70 (iv) Fifth Lok Sabha, 1971-77 and (v) Estimates Committee, Lok Sabha.

Social activities
He was involved in social reforms through Arya Samaj, Improvements for Harijans  and services for refugees.

Writing
He wrote many books, e.g. Vishwashanti Ka Vedic Sandesh, Shruti Saurabh, Dharti par Swarg, Vedic Varna Vyawastha & Yogiraj Krishna.

Permanent address
Arya Nagar, Madrak, District Aligarh, U.P.

References

1915 births
1991 deaths
People from Aligarh district
India MPs 1971–1977
India MPs 1967–1970
Arya Samajis
Lok Sabha members from Uttar Pradesh
Janata Party politicians
Bharatiya Lok Dal politicians
Indian National Congress politicians from Uttar Pradesh